Lucio Bertogna (born 25 February 1946 in San Canzian d'Isonzo) is a retired Italian professional football player. He played for 2 seasons (30 games, 1 goal) in the Serie A for S.S.C. Venezia and A.S. Roma.

Honours
 Serie A champion: 1968/69 (on the roster for ACF Fiorentina, but did not play any league games).
 Coppa Italia winner: 1968/69.

References 

1946 births
Living people
Italian footballers
Serie A players
Venezia F.C. players
A.S. Roma players
A.C. Monza players
A.C. Trento 1921 players
Association football midfielders
People from San Canzian d'Isonzo